Merrittstown may refer to:

Merrittstown, Ohio
Merrittstown, Pennsylvania